York City Ladies Football Club is an English women's football club based in York, England. Founded in 1995, they currently play in the FA Women's National League Division One North.

History
York City Ladies Football Club was founded in 1995. The club won the 2005–06 North East Regional Women's Football League Southern Division, and were promoted to the Premier Division. In July 2020 Chris Hamilton was appointed manager. York won the 2021–22 North East Regional Women's Football League Premier Division, and were promoted to the FA Women's National League Division One North. In June 2022 Steph Fairless was appointed manager.

Stadium
York play their home games at Haxby Road Sports Park. Since 2022 the club can also play home games at York Community Stadium.

Management and staff

Current staff

Managerial history

Honours

League
 North East Regional Women's Football League Premier Division
 Winners (1): 2021–22

 North East Regional Women's Football League Southern Division
 Winners (1): 2005–06

Seasons

References

External links
Official website

Women's football clubs in England
Football clubs in North Yorkshire
Sport in York
Association football clubs established in 1995
1995 establishments in England
FA Women's National League teams